Senator Willard may refer to:

James E. Willard (1903–1988), Pennsylvania State Senate
John D. Willard (1799–1864), New York State Senate
John Willard (judge) (1792–1862), New York State Senate
Joseph A. Willard (1803–1868), New York State Senate
Kenneth R. Willard (1902–1987), New York State Senate
Victor Willard (1813–1869), Wisconsin State Senate
Cynthia Willard-Lewis (born 1952), Louisiana State Senate